Talitha Diggs (born August 22, 2002) is  an American track and field sprinter specializing in the 400 meters. She is the North American indoor record holder in the event.

Diggs won the 2022 U.S. national 400 m title.

Career
Talitha Diggs won the 400 metres race at the 2022 USA Outdoor Track and Field Championships to qualify for the 2022 World Athletics Championships held in Eugene, Oregon. Prior to this, she won the 2022 NCAA Outdoor championship and NCAA indoor championship representing the University of Florida. She was the second woman in NCAA history to win the USA championships, and NCAA outdoor and indoor championships in the same season. She was the 5th fastest collegiate 400m runner in history at the time having run 49.99 to win the NCAA Outdoor Championships.

On 25 February at the SEC Indoor Championships in Fayetteville, Arkansas, Diggs broke the North American and NCAA indoor 400 m records with a time of 50.15 seconds, putting her joint eighth on the respective world all-time list. Previous NCAA record of 50.33 s was set just 90 minutes earlier by Rhasidat Adeleke.

Personal life
Her mother Joetta Clark Diggs also represented her country at athletics in major championships between 1988 and 2002, including four Olympic Games.

Achievements

National and NCAA titles
 USA Outdoor Track and Field Championships
 400 meters: 2022
 NCAA Division I Women's Outdoor Track and Field Championships
 400 meters: 2022
 NCAA Division I Women's Indoor Track and Field Championships
 400 meters: 2022

Personal bests
 60 meters indoor – 7.15 (Fayetteville, AR 2023)
 100 meters – 11.27 (+1.8 m/s, Baton Rouge, LA 2022)
 200 meters – 22.64 (+0.2 m/s, Oxford, MS 2022)
 200 meters indoor – 22.61 (Fayetteville, AR 2023)
 400 meters – 49.99 (Eugene, OR 2022)
 400 meters indoor – 50.15 (Fayetteville, AR 2023) North American record, =8th all time

References

2002 births
Living people
USA Indoor Track and Field Championships winners
World Athletics Championships athletes for the United States
American female sprinters
Sportspeople from New Brunswick, New Jersey
Track and field athletes from New Jersey
21st-century American women
World Athletics Championships medalists
World Athletics Championships winners